"Best Foot Forward" is a 1954 American television episode adaptation of the musical Best Foot Forward. It was directed by Max Liebman as part of a series of color spectaculars. It was Jeannie Carson's American debut.

Cast
 Marilyn Maxwell as Gale Joy
 Robert Cummings as Jack Haggerty
 Charlie Applewhite as Bud Hooper
 Hope Holliday as Minerva
 Jeannie Carson as Helen Twitterton
 Harrison Muller as Dutch
 Pat Carroll as Blind Date
 Candi Parsons as Ethel
 Arte Johnson as Chuck
 James Komack as Hunk
 Howard St. John as Dean Reeber
 Gene Blakely as Chester Billings

Reception
The New York Times called it "delightful".

References

External links
 
 

1954 American television episodes
Max Liebman Presents